Captain George Cathey was an American Revolutionary War Captain who served with one of the twenty companies of the Burke County Regiment. He served as a captain from 1780 to 1783.

Personal life 
George Cathey was born in January 1755 in Mecklenburg County, North Carolina. He was residing in Burke County when he entered service with the United States military in 1776. He fought in the Battle of Kings Mountain in 1780 against the British. After the revolutionary war, he lived in Burke and Buncombe counties before moving to Cooper County in Missouri. He married Margaret Chamberlain c. 1776. Cathey died on December 14, 1840, in Pettis County, Missouri. He is buried in Smithton, Missouri.

Legacy 
There are multiple landmarks in North Carolina named after Cathey, such as Catheys Creek and the George Cathey Memorial Bridge.

References 

1755 births
1840 deaths